Bulldog Crossing is an unincorporated community in Macon County, Illinois, United States.

Notes

Unincorporated communities in Macon County, Illinois
Unincorporated communities in Illinois